Sergio De La Torre is a Mexican photographer, filmmaker and performance artist who teaches photography and film at the University of San Francisco. De La Torre is originally from the Tijuana/San Diego border and migrated to San Francisco. He is the co-founder of the performance group Los Tricksters who perform at various street fairs, academic conferences, art galleries and film festivals.

His photography, film and art focus heavily on the themes and issues surrounding diaspora tourism and identity politics.

He is the director of Maquilapolis, and his other film and video work includes photography for Los Que Se Van, directed by Adolfo Davila, and assistant to the art director on Garden of Eden, directed by Maria Novaro. In 2007 De La Torre won an Artadia Award and in 2001 he received the Moving Image Creative Capital Award.

References

American video artists
American performance artists
Postmodern artists
Artists from the San Francisco Bay Area
Living people
Mexican photographers
American photographers
American experimental filmmakers
University of San Francisco faculty
Year of birth missing (living people)